A flatulist, fartist, or professional farter is an entertainer often associated with a specific type of humor, whose routine consists solely or primarily of passing gas in a creative, musical, or amusing manner.

History
There are a number of scattered references to ancient and medieval flatulists, who could produce various rhythms and pitches with their intestinal wind. Saint Augustine in City of God (De Civitate Dei) (14.24) mentions some performers who did have "such command of their bowels, that they can break wind continuously at will, so as to produce the effect of singing." Juan Luis Vives, in his 1522 commentary to Augustine's work, testifies to having himself witnessed such a feat, a remark referenced by Michel de Montaigne in an essay.

The professional farters of medieval Ireland were called braigetoír. They are listed together with other performers and musicians in the 12th century Tech Midchúarda, a diagram of the banqueting hall of Tara. As entertainers, these braigetoír ranked at the lower end of a scale headed by bards, fili, and harpers.

An entry in the 13th-century English Liber Feodorum or Book of Fees lists one Roland the Farter, who held Hemingstone manor in the county of Suffolk, for which he was obliged to perform "Unum saltum et siffletum et unum bombulum" (one jump and whistle and one fart) annually at the court of King Henry II every Christmas. The Activa Vita character in the 14th century allegorical poem Piers Plowman appears to number farting among the abilities desirable in a good entertainer, saying: "As for me, I can neither drum nor trumpet, nor tell jokes, nor fart amusingly at parties, nor play the harp."

In Japan, during the Edo period, flatulists were known as "heppiri otoko" (放屁男), lit. "farting men."
The term He-gassen (屁合戦), "farting competitions", is applied to Edo-period art scrolls depicting flatulence.

Notable flatulists
 Mr. Methane, contemporary flatulist
 Le Pétomane, performed in France from 1887 until 1914
 Roland the Farter, flatulist in the court of King Henry II of England.
 Will the Farter, from the Howard Stern Show (2007–08).
 Terrance and Phillip of the US comedy cartoon South Park.

See also 
 Flatulence humor
 Toilet humour

References

Notes

Further reading
 Valerie J. Allen; Broken Air Exemplaria (2004). ( PDF version)
 Jim Dawson; Who Cut the Cheese?: A Cultural History of the Fart (Ten Speed Press, 1999)
 Steve Bryant; The Art Of The Fart
 G. Ramsey; A Breath of Fresh Air: Rectal Music in Gaelic Ireland in  Archaeology Ireland Vol. 16, No. 1, pp. 22–23 (2002)

Entertainment occupations
Flatulence humor
 
Comedy